"Have You Seen Mary" is a song by American rock band Sponge. The song was released in 1996 as the second single from the group's second studio album, Wax Ecstatic.

Release and reception
"Have You Seen Mary" is the band's highest charting song on Billboard's Mainstream Rock Tracks, where it reached number 7.

Music video
The music video for "Have You Seen Mary" was released in 1997 and was directed by Rocky Schenck.

Track listings

Charts

Use in pop culture
The song is featured in the 1997 film Chasing Amy.

Personnel
 Vinnie Dombroski – lead vocals
 Joey Mazzola – guitar, backing vocals
 Mike Cross – guitar
 Tim Cross – bass
 Charlie Grover – drums

References

1996 songs
Sponge (band) songs